Ginkgo huttonii is an extinct Ginkgo species in the family Ginkgoaceae from the Jurassic of England. The fossil is also known by the name, Ginkgoites huttonii, the genus, Ginkgoites, referring to a group of extinct members of the Ginkgoaceae. G. huttonii was a broad-leaved, deciduous gymnosperm bearing resemblance to the only living member of the Ginkgoaceae, Ginkgo biloba.

Description
Ginkgo huttonii is known largely by compression fossils of its leaves. Similar to other members of the Ginkgoites, the fossil leaves of G. huttonii are simple, four-lobed, and have dense, radially disposed venation.<ref name=Nosova>{{cite journal
| last1       = Nosova
| first1      = Natalya
| last2      = Zhang
| first2     = Jian-Wei
| date       = August 2011
| title      = Revision of Ginkgoites obrustschewii (Steward) Seward (Ginkgoales) and the new material from the Jurassic of Northwestern China
| url        = https://www.sciencedirect.com/science/article/pii/S0034666711000777?casa_token=I9T-2zaKI5gAAAAA:K34j71AvMzFwazgIAMQxb6debsKkpjsrqIkkwjuOe1kZIxDe9mrSZWAeeVSGjYfFfrlgARYt
| journal    = Review of Palaeobotany and Palynology
| volume     = 166
| issue      = 3–4
| pages      = 286–294
| doi = 10.1016/j.revpalbo.2011.06.002
}}</ref> G. huttonii fossil seeds are frequently found as well as at least a few fossilized male catkins. G. huttonii wood has yet to be described but it is likely the plant was similar to the extant, G. biloba, with wood akin to that of modern-day conifers.

Distribution G. huttonii is heavily represented in the Jurassic flora of Yorkshire, England - a flora which has been studied in depth since the 1800s. The order Ginkgoales had a wide distribution throughout the northern hemisphere from the Lower Jurassic through the Cretaceous.

DiscoveryG. Huttonii'' was discovered in the 1800s when excavation began throughout the Yorkshire formation. The fossil was first described by Oswald Heer.

References

External links
 http://www.fossilmuseum.net/plantfossils/Ginkgo-huttoni/Ginkgo-huttoni.htm

huttonii
Jurassic plants
Mesozoic trees